Eswarankoil  is a village in the Annavasal revenue block of Pudukkottai district, Tamil Nadu, India.

Demographics 

As per the 2001 census, Eswarankoil had a total population of 2014 with 1019 males and 995 females. The sex ratio was 976. The literacy rate was 40.71%

References

Villages in Pudukkottai district